Tetsu (written: 哲, 徹, 鉄 or テツ in katakana) is a masculine Japanese given name. Notable people with the name include:

, Japanese photographer
, Japanese voice actor
, Japanese musician
, Japanese politician and Prime Minister of Japan
, Japanese-American actor
, Japanese footballer and manager
Tetsu Nakamura (disambiguation), multiple people
, Japanese golfer
, Japanese actor
, Japanese voice actor
, Japanese footballer
, Japanese musician
, Japanese actor
, Japanese footballer
, real name Tetsuo Yamauchi, Japanese musician
, Japanese science fiction translator and writer
Tetsushi Mizokami (born 1948), Japanese founder of Uncle Tetsu's Cheesecake
Tetsuya (musician) (born 1969), formerly known as Tetsu, a musician

See also
Tetsuzō Iwamoto (1916–1955), Sub-Lieutenant fighter plane ace during World War II
Tetsu (railfan) - Short for tetsudōfan (鉄道ファン), literally "railway fan" in Japanese.	

 	
Japanese masculine given names